Karizak-e Hajji Pasand (also Romanized as Kārīzak-e Ḩājjī Pasand; also known as Kārīzak and Kārīzak-e Ḩājj Pasand) is a village in Jannatabad Rural District, Salehabad County, Razavi Khorasan Province, Iran. At the 2006 census, its population was 334, in 74 families.

References 

Populated places in   Torbat-e Jam County